The 1997 Men's European Water Polo Championship was the 23rd edition of the bi-annual event, organised by the Europe's governing body in aquatics, the Ligue Européenne de Natation. The event took place in Seville, Spain from August 13 to August 22, 1997, as an integrated part of the European LC Championships 1997.

Teams

GROUP A
 

 

GROUP B

First round

GROUP A

August 13, 1997

August 14, 1997

August 15, 1997

August 16, 1997

August 17, 1997

GROUP B

August 13, 1997

August 14, 1997

August 15, 1997

August 16, 1997

August 17, 1997

Quarterfinals

Semifinals

Finals
Ninth place

Seventh place

Fifth place

Third place

First place

Final ranking

The first eight teams qualified for the 1998 FINA Men's World Water Polo Championship in Perth, Australia; Bulgaria and Ukraine were relegated.

Individual awards
Most Valuable Player
???
Best Goalkeeper
???
Topscorer
???

References
 Zwemkroniek (September, 1997)
 Coniliguria

Men
1997
International water polo competitions hosted by Spain
European Championship
Water polo